The Washington Street Bridge was built 1932–1934 in Brainerd in the U.S. state of Minnesota. It carries four lanes of Minnesota State Highway 210 across the Upper Mississippi River.

See also
List of crossings of the Upper Mississippi River

References

Road bridges in Minnesota
Bridges over the Mississippi River
Bridges completed in 1934
Concrete bridges in the United States
Open-spandrel deck arch bridges in the United States
Buildings and structures in Crow Wing County, Minnesota
1934 establishments in Minnesota